Seymour Siwoff (November 9, 1920 – November 29, 2019) was an American statistician and businessman who was the president and chief executive of the Elias Sports Bureau from 1952 to 2019. He was named a finalist for the 2020 class of the Pro Football Hall of Fame as a contributor, however he was not elected.

Biography
Siwoff was born in Brooklyn on November 1, 1920. His sister was television director and producer Lela Swift. In 1943, he graduated from St. John's University with a degree in accounting and then served during World War II in the 88th Infantry Division where he was hit by shrapnel in Italy. He worked as an accountant after the war and in 1948 took a position with the Elias Sports Bureau, the official statistician of the National League, where he had interned during college. In 1952, he purchased the Bureau from the widows of Al Munro Elias and Walter Bruce Elias, who founded the company in 1913. Under Siwoff, the company was known for providing more obscure facts (day/night games, performance against left/right-handed pitchers, home/away, and with runners in scoring position), foreshadowing the modern era's advanced statistics. In 1980, the Elias Sports Bureau became the official statistician  of the American League, replacing the Sports Information Center. Siwoff expanded the company into providing statistical support to the NFL, NBA, WNBA, Major League Soccer, and various television and radio networks.

Personal life
He was married to Gertrude Schatzberg (1921–2018); they had two children, Nancy Siwoff Gilston and Ronald Siwoff. He died at his home in Manhattan on November 29, 2019. His grandson, Joe Gilston, is owner and president of the Elias Sports Bureau.

References

External links

1920 births
2019 deaths
United States Army personnel of World War II
American chief executives of professional sports organizations
American statisticians
American technology chief executives
Businesspeople from Brooklyn
People from Brighton Beach
St. John's University (New York City) alumni